Sophronica wittmeri is a species of beetle in the family Cerambycidae. It was described by Holzschuh in 1992.

References

Sophronica
Beetles described in 1992